A stopcock is a form of valve used to control the flow of a liquid or gas. The term is not precise and is applied to many different types of valve. The only consistent attribute is that the valve is designed to completely stop the flow when closed fully.

Use

Water service
Stopcocks are used to grossly regulate  the flow of tap water in residential and commercial services. One is found at the junction of a water main and the branch leading to an individual service (allowing the service to be isolated from the main trunk), and a second inside the structure (allowing its plumbing to be isolated from the branch line leading into it).  Either is employed when maintenance or emergency repairs are conducted.

Laboratory

For laboratory glassware, items sometimes have plug valves with conically-tapered inserts called stopcocks (sometimes referred to as "plugs" by laypeople) with different bores. The valve bodies are usually made of glass, while the plugs are made of glass or Teflon. One can also find valves with Teflon spindle (for example one way valves or angled valves) When the plug is made of glass, the handle and plug are fused together in one piece out of glass. When both valve body and plug are made of glass, a suitable grease (e.g. silicone grease or Ramsay grease) is usually used to give a good seal, as well as to prevent the valve from seizing and subsequently cracking.

Special stopcocks are available, such as a double-oblique design used in Schlenk lines which permit the application of inert gas and vacuum from the same stopcock.

Stopcocks are often parts of laboratory glassware such as burettes, separatory funnels, Schlenk flasks, and columns used for column chromatography.  The stopcock is a smooth tampered plug or rotor with a handle, which fits into a corresponding ground glass female joint.  The stationary female joint is designed such that it joins two or more pieces of glass tubing.  The stopcock has holes bored through it which allow the tubes attached to the female joint to be connected or separated with partial turns of the stopcock.  Most stopcocks are solid pieces with linear bores although some are hollow with holes to simple holes that can line up the joints tubing.  The stopcock is held together with the female joint with a metal spring, plastic plug retainer, a washer and nut system, or in some cases vacuum.  Stopcocks plugs are generally made out of ground glass or an inert plastic like PTFE.  The ground glass stopcocks are greased to create an airtight seal and prevent the glass from fusing.  The plastic stopcocks are at most lightly oiled.

Stopcocks are generally available individually with some length of glass tubing at the ports so that they can be joined by a glass blower into custom apparatus at the point of use.  This is especially common for the large glass manifolds used in high vacuum lines. Many additional variations exist in both plug boring and joint assembly.

Types
 1-, 2- and 3-way stopcocks
 Needle valve stopcocks straight or right-angled
 Burette stopcocks straight or lateral
 Desiccator stopcocks
 Vacuum stopcocks one-way straight or parallel, one-way right-angled or 2-way

Gallery

External links

References

Plumbing valves
Laboratory glassware

ru:Задвижка